Rick Neufeld is a Canadian folk singer. Neufeld was born in Deloraine, Manitoba and raised near Boissevain. Neufeld attended Mennonite Collegiate Institute in Gretna before moving to Winnipeg to attend the University of Manitoba, where he met Paul Simon. Neufeld initially played coffeehouses throughout Canada and the United States before he got his own CBC Television show, The Songsingers. He released a number of albums, including Hiway Child in 1971, Prairie Dog in 1975 and Manitoba Songs in 1978.  He was most successful as a songwriter, and his song "Moody Manitoba Morning" became a hit for The Bells.

The album Prairie Dog featured The Guess Who members Burton Cummings, Bill Wallace, and Gary Peterson as well as Terry Bush backing Neufeld.

Discography

Albums

Singles

References

Canadian country singer-songwriters
Canadian folk singer-songwriters
Canadian male singer-songwriters
Living people
People from Boissevain, Manitoba
Musicians from Manitoba
Year of birth missing (living people)
Canadian Mennonites
Mennonite musicians